The Truffle Hunters is a 2020 documentary film directed and produced by Michael Dweck and Gregory Kershaw. It follows a group of aging men hunting in the woods, for a prized quarry, the Alba truffle. Luca Guadagnino serves as an executive producer under his Frenesy Film Company banner.

It had its world premiere at the Sundance Film Festival on January 30, 2020, and was released on March 5, 2021, by Sony Pictures Classics. It received positive reviews.

Synopsis
A group of aging men hunt in the woods in Northern Italy, for a prized quarry, the Alba truffle.

Release
The film had its world premiere at the Sundance Film Festival on January 30, 2020. Shortly after, Sony Pictures Classics acquired distribution rights to the film for $1.5 million. It was set to screen at the Cannes Film Festival and the Telluride Film Festival prior to their cancellations due to the COVID-19 pandemic. It also screened at the Toronto International Film Festival on September 18, 2020 and at the New York Film Festival on October 5, 2020.

The film was released in the United States on March 5, 2021. It was previously scheduled to be released on December 25, 2020 and March 12, 2021. BBC Four Storyville broadcast The Truffle Hunters.

Michael Dweck & Gregory Kershaw had conversations at Film Festivals.

Reception
The site's critics consensus reads: "The Truffle Hunters explores a world most viewers will know nothing aboutwith delightfully savory results." On Metacritic, the film has a weighted average score of 85 out of 100, based on 24 critics, indicating "universal acclaim".

References

External links
 
 

2020 films
American documentary films
Greek documentary films
Italian documentary films
Sony Pictures Classics films
2020 documentary films
Films postponed due to the COVID-19 pandemic
2020s American films